Untitled, also known as Bench, is an outdoor 2004–2007 Roy McMakin sculpture by Roy McMakin, installed at Olympic Sculpture Park in Seattle, Washington.

References

2007 sculptures
Concrete sculptures in Washington (state)
Olympic Sculpture Park